Ecitoninae is an ant subfamily.

They are carnivorous ants that are characterized by organizing periodic expeditions of thousands of individuals. They do not build colonies and have a constantly moving way of life. Some birds regularly follow these expeditions in order to find insects and other small animals that try to escape the attack of ants.

Distribution 
They are found in America, from the southern United States to northern Argentina.

Ecology 
This group of ants (with Aenictinae and Dorylinae subfamilies) they represent the nomadic ants that do not build anthills, and constantly go from one camp to another, at the same time carrying with them all the food for the larvae, which consists of prey of the invertebrates they attack.

Tribes and genera 
It contains 156 species in 5 genera. 

 Tribe Cheliomyrmecini 
 Cheliomyrmex - 4 spp.
 Tribe Ecitonini
 Eciton -  10 spp.
 Labidus -  10 spp.
 Neivamyrmex -  130 spp.
 Nomamyrmex - 2 spp.

References 

 Bolton B. (1992). A new general catalogue of the ants of the world, Harvard University Press, Cambridge, MA.
 Brady, S. (2003). Evolution of the army ant syndrome: the origin and long-term evolutionary stasis of a complex of behavioral and reproductive adaptations. PNAS 100(11): 6575-6579.

Ants
Ant subfamilies